Senator Handley may refer to:

Harold W. Handley (1909–1972), Indiana State Senate
Mary Ann Handley (born 1936), Connecticut State Senate

See also
Senator Hanley (disambiguation)